Theloderma, the bug-eyed frogs, mossy frogs or warty frogs, is a genus of frogs in the family Rhacophoridae, subfamily Rhacophorinae. They are found from northeastern India and southern China, through Southeast Asia, to the Greater Sunda Islands; the highest species richness is in Indochina. Some species, especially T. corticale, are sometimes kept in captivity.

They are medium to small-sized frogs with maximum snout–vent lengths that range from  depending on species, and their skin can be smooth, warty or tuberculated. The genus includes species that are contrastingly marked, but most are very well-camouflaged, resembling plant material (typically bark or moss) or bird droppings.

Little is known about their behavior, but they feed on small arthropods. In species where known, breeding takes place in a small water pool in a cavity of a tree, bamboo or karst. The female places 4–20 eggs just above the water. After about one to two weeks they hatch into tadpoles that drop into the water; they metamorphose into froglets after a few months to a year.

Species and taxonomy

The sister taxon of Theloderma is Nyctixalus. The taxonomy of this genus and Nyctixalus as well as Theloderma moloch has been in flux; today both AmphibiaWeb and Amphibian Species of the World recognize the two genera as valid.

Following the Amphibian Species of the World, there are 26 recognized species in the genus Theloderma:

 Theloderma albopunctatum (Liu and Hu, 1962)
 Theloderma annae Nguyen, Pham, Nguyen, Ngo, and Ziegler, 2016
 Theloderma asperum (Boulenger, 1886)
 Theloderma auratum Poyarkov, Kropachev, Gogoleva, and Orlov, 2018
 Theloderma baibengense (Jiang, Fei, and Huang, 2009)
 Theloderma bicolor (Bourret, 1937)
 Theloderma corticale (Boulenger, 1903)
 Theloderma gordoni Taylor, 1962
 Theloderma horridum (Boulenger, 1903)
 Theloderma lacustrinum Sivongxay, Davankham, Phimmachak, Phoumixay, and Stuart, 2016
 Theloderma laeve (Smith, 1924)
 Theloderma lateriticum Bain, Nguyen, and Doan, 2009
 Theloderma leporosum Tschudi, 1838
 Theloderma licin McLeod and Norhayati, 2007
 Theloderma moloch (Annandale, 1912)
 Theloderma nagalandense Orlov, Dutta, Ghate, and Kent, 2006
 Theloderma nebulosum Rowley, Le, Hoang, Dau, and Cao, 2011
 Theloderma palliatum Rowley, Le, Hoang, Dau, and Cao, 2011
 Theloderma petilum (Stuart and Heatwole, 2004)
 Theloderma phrynoderma (Ahl, 1927)
 Theloderma pyaukkya Dever, 2017
 Theloderma rhododiscus (Liu and Hu, 1962)
 Theloderma ryabovi Orlov, Dutta, Ghate, and Kent, 2006
 Theloderma stellatum Taylor, 1962
 Theloderma truongsonense (Orlov and Ho, 2005)
 Theloderma vietnamense Poyarkov, Orlov, Moiseeva, Pawangkhanant, Ruangsuwan, Vassilieva, Galoyan, Nguyen, and Gogoleva, 2015
 Theloderma khoii Ninh, Nguyen, Nguyen, Hoang, Siliyavong, Nguyen, Le, Le & Ziegler, 2022

References

 
Rhacophoridae
Amphibians of Asia
Amphibian genera
Taxa named by Johann Jakob von Tschudi